The Coward House was a historic house at 1105 North Maple Street in Searcy, Arkansas.  It was a single-story brick structure, with an irregular cross-gable roof configuration that was hipped at its center.  Its east-facing front facade had a shed-roof porch that wrapped around to the south, supported by box columns mounted on brick piers.  Built c. 1915, this vernacular house was one of a modest number from that period to survive in the city.

The house was listed on the National Register of Historic Places in 1992.  It has been listed as destroyed in the Arkansas Historic Preservation Program database, and was delisted in 2018.

See also
National Register of Historic Places listings in White County, Arkansas

References

Houses on the National Register of Historic Places in Arkansas
Houses completed in 1915
Houses in Searcy, Arkansas
National Register of Historic Places in Searcy, Arkansas
Former National Register of Historic Places in Arkansas
Demolished buildings and structures in Arkansas
1915 establishments in Arkansas